Eight virtues may refer to:
The eight virtues of the Four Cardinal Principles and Eight Virtues as enumerated by Chinese political philosopher Sun Yat-sen
The eight virtues of Bushidō defined by Nitobe Inazō
The Ashtavaranas, or eight virtues, of Lingayatism
The eight virtues of the role-playing video game Ultima IV: Quest of the Avatar
The eight heavenly virtues expounded by Taoist Tai Chi founder Moy Lin-shin
The Eight Honors and Eight Shames, also known as the Eight Virtues and Shames, a set of moral concepts developed by former Chinese Communist Party General Secretary Hu Jintao
The seven virtues of Christianity (heavenly or capital) with an added virtue